Mace and Chain is an "Ancient Eight" society, or one of the eight landed secret societies, at Yale University. It was founded in 1956 with the mission of providing fifteen rising seniors with the traditional senior society experience in a freer, more modern setting. Mace and Chain's tomb, a centuries-old colonial structure owned by the society, boasts various military artifacts, Revolutionary War documents, and a purposefully open appearance. As is tradition for Yale secret societies, the tomb is accessible only to current members and alumni.

History

The society was founded by Thornton Marshall with the help of poet and Yale professor Robert Penn Warren in 1956 (four years after Manuscript), together compiling what students refer to as the "Ancient Eight" societies on campus. Warren had encouraged Marshall "to start something which is a little closer to reality and that can exist in the sunlight," in contrast with other senior societies. 

Its regular meeting place (called a "tomb"—a 190-year-old, six bedroom Colonial-style house in downtown New Haven) was salvaged from Benedict Arnold's home in New Haven and is a New Haven Historical Landmark. The society's alumni trust, the Night's Trust Foundation, owns and operates the tomb.

Mission

Like other societies at Yale, Mace and Chain conducts meetings on Thursday and Sunday evenings. Among other activities and traditions, each member takes one evening to relay their life story and personal development to the rest of the group. 

The name Mace and Chain is rooted in discussions amongst the founders about chivalry. 

The society has a tradition of rotating student leadership each week and is unique among Yale's societies in allowing each new "delegation" (new senior class) to determine its own ground rules, excluding a few secret guidelines. This has helped Mace and Chain develop a reputation for fostering unusually close-knit senior classes, as members together build their society experience. 

Mace and Chain alumni have gone on to become journalists, authors, academics, filmmakers and members of Congress. The society hosts Yale professors and outside guests during its weekly dinners. Past faculty advisors to Mace and Chain include Charlie Hill, a former senior advisor to Secretary of State Henry Kissinger, and John Wilkinson, a former vice president of Yale.

Members

Each year, the society admits a new tap class of fifteen rising seniors. Tap classes have historically included top-tier athletes and student leaders such as editors of the Yale Daily News and Yale Herald, Yale College Council officers, and various campus political activists.

A valued criterion of all taps is adherence to the enduring values of chivalry, on which Mace and Chain was founded. That is, a reputation for respecting all members of the Yale community, demonstrating a strong moral compass and valuing ideas and others above oneself.

See also
Yale University
Collegiate secret societies in North America
 Scroll and Key Society
 Manuscript Society
 Berzelius Society

References

Secret societies at Yale
Student organizations established in 1956